Bo Ronny Michael Persson (born 11 August 1966) is a Swedish para alpine skier and wheelchair curler.

Sports career
As a para alpine skier (LW10 class: sitting, paraplegia with no or some upper abdominal function and no functional sitting balance) he participated at the 1998 Winter Paralympics (won a bronze medal in downhill) and at the 2002 Winter Paralympics (won three silver medals - in slalom, giant slalom and super-G - and a bronze medal in downhill).

Before the 2006 Winter Paralympics, the idea was that Ronny would end his alpine career by winning a Paralympic gold, which he did at most of the World Cups. But an injury that led to a serious infection and sepsis put an end to these plans.

After some years without sport he started wheelchair curling at 2013.

As a wheelchair curler he participated in the 2018 Winter Paralympics where Swedish team finished on tenth place.

He was a Swedish flag bearer at the 2018 Winter Paralympics opening ceremony.

In 2004 he had a nomination for the Laureus World Sportsperson of the Year with Disability Award.

Teams

References

External links 

 
 Video: 

Living people
1966 births
Sportspeople from Västernorrland County
Swedish male curlers
Swedish wheelchair curlers
Paralympic wheelchair curlers of Sweden
Wheelchair curlers at the 2018 Winter Paralympics
Swedish wheelchair curling champions
Paralympic alpine skiers of Sweden
Alpine skiers at the 1998 Winter Paralympics
Alpine skiers at the 2002 Winter Paralympics
Wheelchair curlers at the 2022 Winter Paralympics
Paralympic silver medalists for Sweden
Paralympic bronze medalists for Sweden
Medalists at the 1998 Winter Paralympics
Medalists at the 2002 Winter Paralympics
Medalists at the 2022 Winter Paralympics
Paralympic medalists in alpine skiing
Paralympic medalists in wheelchair curling
21st-century Swedish people